USS Kanawha (SP-169) was a patrol vessel which never saw active service that was purchased by the United States Navy in 1917.

The U.S. Navy purchased USS Kanawha from H. C. Baxter of Brunswick, Maine, on 27 April 1917 for use as a patrol vessel during World War I. She was designated SP-169, but was found defective during fitting out and was returned to her owner.

She should not be confused with the replenishment oiler  or the armed yacht , both of which were in U.S. Navy service at or around the same time.

References
 

Patrol vessels of the United States Navy
World War I patrol vessels of the United States
Patrol vessels of the United States